Paratanakia himantegus chii (Chinese:齐氏副田氏鱊,齐氏田中鳑鲏,齐氏田氏鱊 or 齐氏鱊) is a fish, a  subspecies of Tanakia himantegus, that is native to Southern China mainland including Guangdong, Fujian, Jiangsu, and introduced to Taiwan.

Etymology
Named in honor of Chen-Ju Ch’i, Director of Bureau of Education of Honan [now Henan] Province, China, for his “kind support” of the author’s study of Kiangsu fishes.

References

Acheilognathinae